The taekwondo competitions at the 2018 Mediterranean Games took place between 28 June and 30 June at the Salou Pavilion in Salou.

Athletes competed in 8 weight categories.

Medal summary

Men's events

Women's events

Medal table

References

External links
2018 Mediterranean Games – Taekwondo
Results

 
Sports at the 2018 Mediterranean Games
2018
Mediterranean Games